Somenath Maity (सोमनाथ माइति) (born 8 November 1960) is an Indian artist known for his oil paintings of urban landscapes.

Biography

Somenath Maity (Born 8 November 1960, Uttar Darua, Darua, Contai, East Midnapore, 721401, West Bengal, India.) is an Indian painter well-known for his oil paintings of urban landscapes. Often regarded as an avant-garde of contemporary Indian Art, Maity works mostly on canvas. He completed his diploma in Fine Arts from the Indian College of Art, Kolkata in 1980-85 and has held his solo shows at major galleries in Kolkata, Mumbai, Bangalore and New Delhi. His works has also been exhibited in Germany, Sweden and UK. He has received several awards and scholarships including the AIFACS award and scholarship in 1995-02, Birla Academy Award and a Senior Fellowship from the Ministry of HRD, Govt. of India in 2002. He lives and works near Kolkata.

Education

Somenath studied fine arts at the Visual Arts College under guidance of fellow artist Shuvaprasanna in Calcutta and completed his Diploma in Fine Arts from The Indian College of Arts and Draftsmanship.

Honours

 2002-03 Senior Fellowship, ministry of Culture, Govt. of India
 2002 AIFACS Award, New Delhi
 2002 Birla Academy Award, Calcutta
 1995 AIFACS Scholarship, New Delhi
 1993-94 Research Grant from Lalitkala Academy, New Delhi
 1992 All India Youth Art Camp organised by IAAI
 1986 Cultural Dept. of West Bengal
 1984-85 B. P. Poddar Memorial Scholarship, College of Visual Arts, Kolkata
 2012 Jury of All India Camel Colour Art Contest

Solo Shows

 2015 Mahua Art Gallery, Bengaluru
 2014 Jehangeer Art Gallery, Mumbai
 2013 Tao Art Gallery, Mumbai
 2013 Prakrit Art Gallery, Chennai
 2013 Jehangir Art Gallery, Mumbai
 2011 Lalit Kala Akademi, New Delhi
 2011 Tao Art Gallery, Mumbai
 2010 Tao Art Gallery, Mumbai
 2009 Jehangir Art Gallery, Mumbai
 2008 Sanskriti Art Gallery, Calcutta
 2007 Art Space, Calcutta
 2006 Mahua Art Gallery, Bangalore
 2006 Art Folio Gallery, Chandigarh
 2005 Time and Space, Bangalore
 2005 Tao Art Gallery, Mumbai
 2004 Gallery One, Gurgaon
 2003 Jehangir Art Gallery, Mumbai
 2002 Birla Academy of Art & Culture, Calcutta
 2002 Trivenikala Sangam, New Delhi
 2001 Karnataka Chitrakala Parishath, Bangalore
 2000 Karnataka Chitrakala Parishath, Bangalore
 1999 Jehangir Art Gallery, Mumbai
 1998 Birla Academy of Art & Culture, Calcutta
 1997 Rabindra Bhavan, Lalitkala Academy, New Delhi
 1994 Birla Academy of Art & Culture, Calcutta
 1991 Birla Academy of Art & Culture, Calcutta
 1991 Bajaj Art Gallery, Mumbai
 1989 Tagore Art Gallery, Airport, Calcutta
 1986 Academy of Fine Arts, Calcutta

Shows Abroad

 2007 One Man Show and Artist in Residency at Manhattan & Warwick, New York, Fremond, San
 2007 Group Show at London organised by Mahua Art Gallery
 2007 Imprints – Indiart Show at Ueno Royal Museum, Tokyo, Japan
 2007 Royal Academy, London organised by Art Alive
 2006 Group Show at LASALLE-SIA College of the Arts, Singapore
 2006 Group Show at London organised by Aroshi Gallery
 2002 Henley Festival, U.K.
 2002 Group Show and Artist in Residency at Barn Gallery, Henley, U.K.
 1991 Group Show at Greenwich Citizen Art Gallery, U.K.
 1991 Group Show at Ipswitch Art Gallery, U.K.
 1983 One Man Show at Stuttgart, West Germany
 1983 Group Show at Stockholm, Sweden

Press Reception

Maity is well known as an oil painter across India, whether judged by his appearances in national newspapers or by the number of galleries offering his works for sale.

National newspapers 

Maity is treated as a major modern artist by national newspapers and magazines in India:

 The Hindu: A Maity Journey by Lakshmi Krupa. 26 March 2013.
In artist Somenath Maity’s work, currently on display at Prakrit Gallery, one sees the juxtaposition of his childhood memories of a small town with bustling Kolkata chock-a-block with sky-high buildings. The result is a canvas of almost mythical quality — picture long façades illuminated by a crescent of a moon, or soft sunlight pouring out of a corner of an otherwise unlit space.

 MYOD: Against All Odds by Himani Tyagi. 12 December 2011.
Lauded for his avant-garde work, Somenath Maity observes the inner beauty of cities and paints them on his canvases. But childhood to fame has been an arduous journey for him. Here, Himani Tyagi gets a sense of the artist and his art through the prism of his life’s struggles

 The Hindu: Painting sculptures by Aruna Chandaraju. 21 July 2010.
"Somenath Maity interprets the urban sprawl of Kolkata in his many paintings and his untitled canvas offers a slice of that cityscape with elements like a gateway and cross-bar railings, in rich, layered colours." - feature article in one of India's leading national newspapers.

 The Hindu: Forms and figures 30 October 2008.
Somenath Maity’s forms in "Structures" using oil on canvas, Palaniappan R.M.’s striking "Quick Withdrawal" uses geometry, Senathipathi M.’s "Arjuna" — acrylic on paper is a floating fishes, floorboard and Arjuna’s many heads disoriented.

 India Today In the City. Bangalore. 1 October 2008.
"a massive show featuring masters and big names like S.G. Vasudev, Somenath Maity, Basukinath Dasgupta and G Subramaniam"

 Mid Day: Delhi Be cause. Navdeep Kaur Marwah. 13 October 2008.
"'Curated by Gautam Kar, this ongoing group show has on display works of several experienced artists like ... Somenath Maity and Thota Vaikuntham among others. We have selected those artists for the show who have been in this field for over 15 years, as they bring with them the experience and the seriousness that we required,' says Isha Singh, owner of Art Laureate."

Art galleries 

Maity's work is exhibited, reviewed, and sold at many art galleries across India:
 Profile of Somenath Maity on SaffronArt "Recognized today as one of Bengal's important new emerging painters, Maity has already exhibited his works at many major Indian and European galleries. He has won awards and scholarships from most of the major Indian fine art institutions, including the All India Fine Arts and Crafts Society, the Birla Academy and the IAAI. With several one-man exhibitions in India and abroad to his credit, including shows in Germany Sweden and the United Kingdom, his paintings also enjoy pride of place in prestigious permanent collections like those of the National Gallery of Modern Art and the Lalit Kala Academy in New Delhi, the Fukuoka Museum in Japan and also in several corporate and private collections all over the world."
 Art Alive Gallery: Investing in Art recommends "To start, one should invest in large works of younger artists or buy drawings or small works of established artists that suit small budgets. Here are some investment options for a new investor in art at different levels ... Rs. 50,000 to Rs. 100,000 - buy Nupur Kundu, Somenath Maity, Partha Shaw, T.M. Aziz, Ravi Kumar Kashi, Sanjiv Sonpimpare"

Maity's paintings are for sale or exhibited at sites such as: 
 Tao Art Gallery
 Mahua Art Gallery
 Art Alive Gallery
 Studio3 India
 Vikal P Artshop
 Dart.FineArt.com Gallery Kolkata
 ArtSlant.com
 Aryan Art Gallery

References

External links
 Visit Somenath Maity's official website
 View Artist's Profile at Saffron Art Gallery
 View Maity's Profile at Artworld India

1960 births
Living people
Painters from West Bengal
Indian male painters
20th-century Indian painters
People from Midnapore
20th-century Indian male artists